The Tyous Team of Commandos – TTC (| Fariq Tyous min' al-Maghawir) or simply Tyous for short ('Tyous' means 'Male Goat' in Arabic, also translated as the "Stubborn Ones"; "Les Têtus", "Les Obstinés" in French), was a small far-right Christian militia which fought in the 1975-78 phase of the Lebanese Civil War.

Origins
The Tyous (written in Arabic as  pronounced Tyoos) were quietly formed at the early 1970s in Beirut by one Al Anid, a Christian Maronite rightwing activist who strongly opposed the 1969 Cairo Agreement and the presence of Palestine Liberation Organization (PLO) guerrilla factions in Lebanon.  
Prior to 1975 Al Anid cultivated close relations with other Christian rightist parties and organizations, which enabled his group to receive funds and military training, namely from the Kataeb Party and the secretive Al-Tanzim.

The original members of the TTC were predominantly Maronites but soon began to accept volunteers from the Assyrian Christian community of Iraqi origin, who had migrated illegally to Lebanon in the 1960s to escape persecution and poverty in their home country. The Assyrians were drawn – and sworn allegiance – to the militias of the Christian-rightist camp by promises of integration and attaining full Lebanese citizenship.

The name 'Tyous' was reportedly given to the group by Bashir Gemayel, the commander of the KRF and future supremo of the Lebanese Forces (LF).

Structure and organization
The Tyous was organized into a 100 men-strong light infantry group roughly equivalent to an understrength infantry company, initially provided with small-arms purchased on the black market.  
Additional weapons and equipment (including all-terrain vehicles) were acquired after January 1976 from Lebanese Army stocks and Internal Security Forces (ISF) Police stations, which enabled the group to raise a motor force of some gun-trucks armed with heavy machine guns (HMGs), recoilless rifles and a few anti-aircraft autocannons.  They also received covert military assistance from Israel via the Phalange and later the Lebanese Forces.

In the late 1970s the Tyous HQ was located at Ashrafieh, in the 'Museum Crossing' area and respective Green Line sector which they usually manned.  Personally commanded by Al-Anid, the Tyous was technically answerable to the Phalange KRF War Council, but reported directly to Bashir Gemayel instead.

After Bachir Gemayel's assassination in September 1982 however, the TTC was re-organized with Al-Anid never being replaced. However, the Tyous' HQ was placed under the direct orders of Elie Hobeika, and remained so until himself was ousted from the LF command by Samir Geagea in January 1985.

War activities and controversies
Ferocious fighters, the TTC were notourious for their lack of discipline and restraint, who all too often brutally murdered any hapless non-Christian civilian that came into their hands. They crossed the green line at least once a week completing missions and causing trouble with the Leftists without direct orders from Bachir Gemayel; when asked to stop, they would not answer to their orders (Hence the "Tyous" or Stubborn ones").
Although residents around the HQ of the Tyous claim to have attended church Masses in the court behind the building every Sunday morning. Whatever their reputation, residents of Achrafieh still thank the Tyous for protecting the Christian sector in Beirut.

Moreover, their combat reputation was tainted by their direct involvement in atrocities against other Christians. This fact was attested in July – August 1976, when the Phalangists, the Army of Free Lebanon and other Lebanese Front militias overrun after a long siege the Muslim-populated slum districts and adjacent Palestinian refugee camps located at East Beirut – Karantina, al-Maslakh and Tel al-Zaatar – the Tyous joined in the respective massacres and expulsion of the remaining Palestinian refugees and Muslims.

In June 1978, an attack by a combined force of some 10 Tyous' fighters and about 1,000 Phalangists led by Samir Geagea and Elie Hobeika led to the Ehden massacre; whereby their rival Tony Frangieh responsible for the murder of many Phalangists leaders in North Lebanon, was killed along with his family.

Later in July 1980, the Tyous helped once again Bashir and his Phalange-dominated LF in unifying the Christian militias once and for all, by launching a swift attack against the fighters of NLP Tigers Militia in several locations, mainly in the Safra beach resort. Camille Chamoun then disbanded the Tigers and called for a truce, because the Tigers Militia and the Lebanese Forces were "brothers".

The Tyous in the civil war 1975-78
As members of the Lebanese Front since early 1976, the Tyous were committed to the defense of the Christian-held urban and sub-urban eastern districts of the Lebanese Capital from the leftist Lebanese National Movement (LNM) militias.

Engaged for the most part in static operations at Beirut's Green Line, the Tyous bore the brunt of the LNM-PLO alliance 'Spring offensive' held at March that year.  Attached to Dany Chamoun's Tigers Militia, they successfully rebuffed enemy attempts to penetrate their positions along the Achrafieh sector.

Later in February 1978, the Tyous and the Tigers under the command of Bashir Gemayel drove out the Syrian Army from East Beirut during the siege that lasted for a hundred days in a war called the Hundred Days' War. Al-Anid was announced dead at this war, however it was a sniper bullet that cut his ear in half. It was his right-hand man who was killed on the last day of the war.

The Lebanese forces' era 1979-1985
Upon the creation of the Lebanese Forces' Command in 1977, the TTC was easily integrated into the ranks of the new LF militia and attained 'elite' status, displacing the old BG Company (Bachir Gemayel Company) of the KRF.  Eventually, upon joining the Kataeb Party Al-Anid rose to the post of Commander in the 1st unit of the 'Special Forces' of the Lebanese Forces War Council. He hand picked the fighters to join his unit. , and continued to lead the Tyous in some battles. He ordered seniors to use the Tyous' combat powers achieve their own objectives.
 
The TTC was also deeply involved in the highly controversial 'unification of the Christian rifle' operations launched in the late 1970s by Bashir Gemayel, who used the Tyous as an instrument to eliminate its rival Christian militias and leaders to absorb their forces into the LF, thus consolidating them into a powerbase for himself.

In October 1982, just weeks after Bashir Gemayel's death, Al-Anid signed his resignation letter and relieved himself of the command of the Special Forces team in the War Council making it possible for other seniors in the LF to take over command. The next time he was engaged in battle after leaving the LF was when Syrian, Amal Movement and Hobeika's LFEC troops were attacking the defenseless Achrafieh in 1986. With the help of Achrafieh residents and fighters and the Lebanese Army the attack against Achrafieh failed.

Decline and disbandment 1985-86
After Hobeika's downfall in 1985 however, the Tyous' fortunes waned – the unit was disbanded and little trace remained of them since they had no leader. With exception of their old HQ in Museum area facing the museum which still stands until today.  Some unconfirmed reports suggest that former Tyous' members might have joined Hobeika at Zahlé, playing a role in the formation of its dissident Lebanese Forces – Executive Command (LFEC) militia the following year.Other Tyous members were later seen with Michel Aoun in 2005.

See also
 Al-Tanzim
 Lebanese Civil War
 Lebanese Front
 Lebanese Forces
 Lebanese Forces – Executive Command
 List of weapons of the Lebanese Civil War
 Tigers Militia
 Kataeb Regulatory Forces
 Young Men (Lebanon)

Notes

References

 Alain Ménargues, Les Secrets de la guerre du Liban: Du coup d'état de Béchir Gémayel aux massacres des camps palestiniens, Albin Michel, Paris 2004.  (in French)
 Claire Hoy and Victor Ostrovsky, By Way of Deception: The Making and Unmaking of a Mossad Officer, St. Martin's Press, New York 1990. 
 Edgar O'Ballance, Civil War in Lebanon, 1975-92, Palgrave Macmillan, London 1998. 
 Fawwaz Traboulsi, A History of Modern Lebanon: Second Edition, Pluto Press, London 2012. 
 Jonathan Randall, The Tragedy of Lebanon: Christian Warlords, Israeli Adventurers, and American Bunglers, Just World Books, Charlottesville, Virginia 2012. 
 Matthew S. Gordon, The Gemayels (World Leaders Past & Present), Chelsea House Publishers, 1988. 
 Marius Deeb, The Lebanese Civil War, Praeger Publishers Inc., New York 1980. 
 Moustafa El-Assad, Civil Wars Volume 1: The Gun Trucks, Blue Steel books, Sidon 2008. 
 Rex Brynen, Sanctuary and Survival: the PLO in Lebanon, Boulder: Westview Press, Oxford 1990.  – 
Robert Fisk, Pity the Nation: Lebanon at War, London: Oxford University Press, (3rd ed. 2001).  – 
 Samir Kassir, La Guerre du Liban: De la dissension nationale au conflit régional, Éditions Karthala/CERMOC, Paris 1994.  (in French)
 Samer Kassis, 30 Years of Military Vehicles in Lebanon, Beirut: Elite Group, 2003. 
 Samuel M. Katz, Lee E. Russel, and Ron Volstad, Armies in Lebanon 1982-84, Men-at-Arms series 165, Osprey Publishing Ltd, London 1985.  
 William W. Harris, Faces of Lebanon: Sects, Wars, and Global Extensions, Princeton Series on the Middle East, Markus Wiener Publishers, Princeton 1997. , 1-55876-115-2

External links
Picture of al-Anid with Bashir Gemayel, Karantina, east Beirut, September 1981
Chamussy (René) – Chronique d’une guerre: Le Liban 1975-1977 – éd. Desclée – 1978 (in French)

Israeli–Lebanese conflict
Lebanese Front
Factions in the Lebanese Civil War
Lebanese factions allied with Israel